Greenport West is a census-designated place (CDP) in Suffolk County, New York, United States. The population was 2,124 at the 2010 census.

Greenport West is in the Town of Southold.

Geography

Demographics

As of the census of 2000, there were 1,679 people, 750 households, and 459 families residing in the CDP. The population density was 505.2 per square mile (195.3/km2). There were 1,283 housing units at an average density of 386.1/sq mi (149.2/km2). The racial makeup of the CDP was 90.95% White, 5.72% African American, 0.06% Native American, 0.36% Asian, 1.43% from other races, and 1.49% from two or more races. Hispanic or Latino of any race were 5.96% of the population.

There were 750 households, out of which 20.5% had children under the age of 18 living with them, 49.7% were married couples living together, 9.5% had a female householder with no husband present, and 38.7% were non-families. 31.5% of all households were made up of individuals, and 18.0% had someone living alone who was 65 years of age or older. The average household size was 2.24 and the average family size was 2.82.

In the CDP, the population was spread out, with 19.4% under the age of 18, 4.9% from 18 to 24, 21.9% from 25 to 44, 26.6% from 45 to 64, and 27.2% who were 65 years of age or older. The median age was 48 years. For every 100 females, there were 85.9 males. For every 100 females age 18 and over, there were 85.6 males.

The median income for a household in the CDP was $44,063, and the median income for a family was $56,364. Males had a median income of $47,500 versus $28,375 for females. The per capita income for the CDP was $26,322. About 3.2% of families and 5.7% of the population were below the poverty line, including 6.9% of those under age 18 and 9.6% of those age 65 or over.

Schools
 Greenport Union Free School District

References

Southold, New York
Census-designated places in New York (state)
Long Island Sound
Census-designated places in Suffolk County, New York
Populated coastal places in New York (state)